Emre Özkan (born 24 December 1988) is a Turkish football defender who plays for Afjet Afyonspor.

Career
During his contract with Beşiktaş, he has been on loan at Zeytinburnuspor, Ankaragücü, Eskişehirspor, and Orduspor.

On 31 August 2016, he joined Bucaspor on a one-year contract.

Emre has represented Turkey at youth level, but has not been called up to the full squad.

References

External links

1988 births
Living people
Footballers from Istanbul
Turkish footballers
Turkey under-21 international footballers
Turkey youth international footballers
Beşiktaş J.K. footballers
Zeytinburnuspor footballers
Eskişehirspor footballers
Orduspor footballers
Süper Lig players
Association football fullbacks
Association football defenders